Branimir Budetić (born 20 April 1990) is a Paralympic athlete from Croatia. He competed in the javelin throw at the 2008, 2012 and 2016 Paralympics and finished second, third and fourth, respectively.

References

External links

 

Living people
1990 births
Sportspeople from Zagreb
Paralympic athletes of Croatia
Athletes (track and field) at the 2008 Summer Paralympics
Athletes (track and field) at the 2012 Summer Paralympics
Athletes (track and field) at the 2016 Summer Paralympics
Paralympic silver medalists for Croatia
Paralympic bronze medalists for Croatia
Medalists at the 2008 Summer Paralympics
Medalists at the 2012 Summer Paralympics
Paralympic medalists in athletics (track and field)
Croatian male javelin throwers
20th-century Croatian people
21st-century Croatian people